Are You Ready? is the fourth studio album by Spanish singer Abraham Mateo. It was released on 13 November 2015, through Sony Music. The album peaked at number 3 in Spain and at number 7 in Mexico. In Spain, a Deluxe Edition was released in digibook (hardback book), including three Bonus Tracks, a poster, and 24 pages with exclusive photos.

A 2-CD special edition of the album was released on October 7, 2016 containing ten bonus tracks. It includes the singles "Mueve", featuring Argentinian singer Lali, and the ballad "Mi Vecina".

Track listing

Charts

Weekly charts

Year-end charts

Certifications

Notes

References 

2015 debut albums
Abraham Mateo albums
Spanish-language albums